Butler Township may refer to:

Arkansas
 Butler Township, Lonoke County, Arkansas, in Lonoke County, Arkansas
 Butler Township, Randolph County, Arkansas, in Randolph County, Arkansas

Illinois
 Butler Township, Vermilion County, Illinois

Indiana
 Butler Township, DeKalb County, Indiana
 Butler Township, Franklin County, Indiana
 Butler Township, Miami County, Indiana

Iowa
 Butler Township, Butler County, Iowa
 Butler Township, Calhoun County, Iowa
 Butler Township, Jackson County, Iowa
 Butler Township, Scott County, Iowa

Michigan
 Butler Township, Branch County, Michigan

Minnesota
 Butler Township, Otter Tail County, Minnesota

Missouri
 Butler Township, Harrison County, Missouri
 Butler Township, Pemiscot County, Missouri
 Butler Township, St. Clair County, Missouri

Nebraska
 Butler Township, Platte County, Nebraska

Ohio
 Butler Township, Columbiana County, Ohio
 Butler Township, Darke County, Ohio
 Butler Township, Knox County, Ohio
 Butler Township, Mercer County, Ohio
 Butler Township, Montgomery County, Ohio
 Butler Township, Richland County, Ohio

Pennsylvania
 Butler Township, Adams County, Pennsylvania
 Butler Township, Butler County, Pennsylvania
 Butler Township, Luzerne County, Pennsylvania
 Butler Township, Schuylkill County, Pennsylvania

South Dakota
 Butler Township, Day County, South Dakota, in Day County, South Dakota
 Butler Township, Sanborn County, South Dakota, in Sanborn County, South Dakota

Township name disambiguation pages